Esad Hećimović (14 July 1963  – 30 April 2017) was a Bosnian investigative journalist and political analyst. At the time of his death, he was working as the Editor-in-chief at OBN TV Station in Sarajevo. He was one of the Founders and Board Members of the European Centre for Press and Media Freedom. Hećimović has worked with a number of Western journalists and media outlets, including some Pulitzer Prize winners on crossborder investigations through the past 20 years. He was awarded for his contribution to investigative journalism by SEEMO and Central European Initiative in 2009. In 2011, he was named as The Journalist of the Year in Bosnia and Herzegovina. 

He wrote a book, Garibi: mudžahedini u BiH 1992-1999 (Garibi:Mujahideens in Bosnia 1992-1999), which reveals crimes committed by the Bosnian mujahideen.

Education 
Esad Hećimović attained a Bachelor's degree in philosophy and sociology at the Faculty of Philosophy, at the University of Sarajevo.

Career

Hećimović began his career as a correspondent for Večernje novosti, a high circulation Belgrade-based newspaper. From 1991 to 1992, he was a reporter for Muslimanski Glas, a Sarajevo-based weekly. From 1992 to 1995 he was Political Analyst during wartime for Central Office and Main Board of SDA political party. He also worked as an analyst for Ljiljan, a weekly newspaper.

From 1998 to 2010 he was an Investigative journalist for BH Dani magazine. In 2011, he was Deputy editor in chief at Oslobođenje.

In 2012 he worked as a Deputy editor in chief at Dani.

In 2015 he was a Founding Member at European Center for Press and Media Freedom.

At the time of his death, he was working as the Editor-in-chief at OBN TV in Sarajevo.

Awards and distinctions

References

External links 
 Esad Hećimović at ECPMF
 Media Observatory
 JournalismFund.eu
 Interviews with Esad Hećimović in  "Jihad Joe: Americans Who Go to War in the Name of Islam" written by J.M.Berger 
 Special Mentions among the Winners of the CEI SEEMO Award For Outstanding Merits in Investigative Journalism (2009)
 Google Books - "Garibi - Mujahideens in Bosnia 1992 - 1999" 
 From Bosnia and Herzegovina to Northern Kosovo: Coping with the Remaining Impasses in the Western Balkans
 Esad Hećimović as one of the authors in the publication International Conference: Current Security Challenges for the Western Balkan Region
 Referred in the book "The Ideological War on Terror: Worldwide Strategies For Counter-Terrorism" by Anne Aldis and Graeme Herd

1963 births
2017 deaths
People from Zenica
Bosnia and Herzegovina journalists
Bosniaks of Bosnia and Herzegovina
Investigative journalists
University of Sarajevo alumni